Mueang Prachinburi is the capital district (amphoe mueang) of Prachinburi province, eastern Thailand.

Geography
Neighboring districts are (from the east clockwise): Prachantakham, Si Maha Phot, Si Mahosot, and Ban Sang of Prachinburi Province; and Pak Phli of Nakhon Nayok province.

Administration
The district is divided into 13 sub-districts (tambons), which are further subdivided into 144 villages (mubans). Prachinburi is a town (thesaban mueang) which covers tambon Na Mueang. There are two townships (thesaban tambons). Ban Na Prue covers parts of tambon Noen Hom, and Khok Makok covers parts of tambon Non Hom. There are a further 12 tambon administrative organizations (TAO).

References

Mueang Prachinburi